Sport Lisboa e Benfica is a Portuguese professional football club based in Lisbon whose involvement in European competition dates back to the 1950s. As champions of Portugal, Benfica were supposed to participate in the inaugural edition of the European Cup in 1955, but they were not invited by the organizers. Two years later, Benfica made their European debut against Sevilla in the European Cup, on 19 September 1957.

Benfica won their first European title in 1961, defeating Barcelona to win the European Cup, and successfully retained the title in the following year after defeating Real Madrid. After that, they appeared in five more finals (1963, 1965, 1968, 1988 and 1990) but did not reconquer the title. Benfica has also reached three UEFA Cup/UEFA Europa League finals (1983, 2013 and 2014).

With two consecutive European Cup titles, a Portuguese feat, Benfica are the second most decorated Portuguese team in overall UEFA competitions and hold the Portuguese record for most appearances in finals of UEFA competitions, with ten appearances. Additionally, their 42 participations in the Champions League (formerly the European Cup) are only surpassed by Real Madrid, and as of May 2022, Benfica occupy the eighth place at the competition's all-time ranking.

Benfica's biggest European win is 10–0, which came against Stade Dudelange of Luxembourg for the 1965–66 European Cup, and their 18–0 aggregate win (8–0 in the first leg) constitutes a European Cup record. Brazilian defender Luisão holds the club record for most appearances in Europe, with 124 matches, while Portuguese striker Eusébio is the club's leading European goalscorer, with 56 goals.

Background

The first continental competition organised by UEFA was the European Cup in 1955. Conceived by Gabriel Hanot, the editor of L'Équipe, as a competition for winners of the European national football leagues, it is considered the most prestigious European football competition. That year, Benfica had won the Primeira Divisão, but the European Cup organizers selected Sporting CP to take part in the first edition. Another club competition, the Inter-Cities Fairs Cup, was established in 1955 and contested in parallel with the European Cup. It eventually came under the auspices of UEFA in 1971, who rebranded it as UEFA Cup. Since the 2009–10 season, the competition has been known as the UEFA Europa League.

In 1957, Benfica won the league title and assured their European debut in the 1957–58 European Cup. The following years, UEFA created additional club competitions. The first, the Cup Winners' Cup, was inaugurated in 1960 for the winners of domestic cup competitions. Established in 1973, the UEFA Super Cup was originally a match played between the winners of the European Cup and the Cup Winners' Cup. Since 2000, it has been contested by the winners of the Champions League (formerly the European Cup) and the Europa League (formerly the UEFA Cup).

The Intercontinental Cup was a competition for the winners of the European Cup (the later UEFA Champions League) and its South American equivalent, the Copa Libertadores. Established in 1960, the Intercontinental Cup was jointly organised by UEFA and the Confederación Sudamericana de Fútbol (CONMEBOL). It ran until 2004, when it was replaced by the FIFA Club World Cup, which includes the winners of all six continental confederations' premier club competitions.

1950–79
Benfica's first European silverware came in 1950 when, managed by Ted Smith, they beat French side Bordeaux at the Estádio Nacional in Oeiras, Portugal, to win the Latin Cup. Seven years later, the team reached their second and last Latin Cup final, but lost to Alfredo Di Stéfano's Real Madrid. After an unsuccessful UEFA competition debut in the 1957–58 European Cup, where they lost to Sevilla in the initial round, Benfica hired Hungarian manager Béla Guttmann, who led the team to their first ever European Cup final on 31 May 1961. Having overcome Hearts, Újpest Dózsa, AGF Aarhus and Rapid Wien, Benfica faced Barcelona in the final, where goals from José Águas, Mário Coluna and an own goal from Antoni Ramallets helped the club lift its first European Cup. The following year, already with Eusébio in the lineup, Guttmann guided the team to back-to-back European Cup successes. After defeating Austria Wien, 1. FC Nürnberg and Tottenham Hotspur, Benfica met Real Madrid in the final on 2 May 1962. A hat-trick from Ferenc Puskás put the Spanish champions ahead before half-time, but a double from Coluna and rising star Eusébio overturned the score to 5–3.

After consecutive European Cup wins, Guttmann reportedly approached the club's board of directors asking for a pay rise. As his demand was turned down, he left the club and reportedly professed his alleged curse. Benfica replaced him with Fernando Riera, and while the Chilean manager led the team to a third-straight European Cup final, he failed to emulate Guttmann's success. On 25 May 1963, against Milan, Benfica's chances were slim after a harsh tackle from Gino Pivatelli severely debilitated Coluna. In a time when substitutions did not exist, Benfica played the rest of the match crippled, and two second-half goals from José Altafini sent the trophy to Italy. After a poor performance in the 1963–64 European Cup, Benfica returned to the final in the following season. Led by Romanian manager Elek Schwartz, Benfica eliminated Real Madrid 5–1 in the quarter-finals on their way to meet the holders Inter Milan in the final, played at Inter's home ground, San Siro, in a muddy and waterlogged pitch. A mistake from Alberto da Costa Pereira, allowing a shot from Jair to pass between his legs, cost Benfica their second attempt at a European Cup treble.

The following season, Benfica defeated Stade Dudelange 18–0 on aggregate, establishing a European record for biggest win on aggregate. However, at a later stage of the competition, they conceded a record home defeat to Manchester United and were eliminated. After one year competing in the Inter-Cities Fairs Cup, Benfica returned to the European Cup and reached their fifth final in 1968. After eliminating Juventus 3–0 in the semi-finals, Benfica faced Manchester United at Wembley Stadium on 29 May 1968. Bobby Charlton opened the score, but Jaime Graça equalised on the 79th minute. Near the end of regular time, Eusébio squandered a one-on-one chance against Alex Stepney and the match went to extra time, where three goals in eight minutes gave the English side their first European title.
The following season, Benfica were stopped in the quarter-finals by Ajax after a replay in Paris. As in the previous season's final, Benfica conceded three goals during extra time and were eliminated. In 1969–70, Benfica fell in the second round against Scottish team and eventual finalists Celtic in a coin toss decision.

After a mildly successful period in the 1960s, where they stood among the top contenders, Southern European teams started to lose influence in the European stage during the 1970s, as Dutch and German teams appeared stronger. In the 1971–72 European Cup, Benfica lost in the semi-finals to a Johan Cruyff-led Ajax on their way to a second consecutive win. Benfica reached the quarter-finals of the 1974–75 European Cup Winners' Cup before being eliminated by another Dutch team, PSV Eindhoven. Over the course of the late 1970s, as historic players like Eusébio and Simões retired, Benfica could not maintain the same performance of the previous decade and only secured two European Cup quarter-final presences. In 1975–76, they lost 5–1 to the holders Bayern Munich, and in 1977–78 they were knocked out by the defending champions Liverpool with a 6–2 aggregate score.

Competitive record 

Note: Benfica score is always listed first.

1980–95
In the beginning of the 1980s, Benfica's domestic dominance had dwindled, leaving the team to play in second-level competitions, namely the Cup Winners' Cup and the UEFA Cup. In 1980–81, the team reached the Cup Winners' Cup semi-finals but lost to Carl Zeiss Jena from East Germany. This performance was bested two seasons later, as Benfica reached the 1983 UEFA Cup Final after overcoming a quarter-final bout against a Roma side featuring Falcão and Bruno Conti. In the two-legged final, Benfica faced Belgium's Anderlecht. In the first leg, on 4 May 1983, Benfica lost in Brussels with a sole goal from Kenneth Brylle. In the second leg, fourteen days later, Benfica manager Sven-Göran Eriksson chose not to start Zoran Filipović and João Alves, both undisputed starters, and the team drew 1–1, losing another European final. Benfica returned to the European Cup in the following two seasons, but defeats against Liverpool in both participations showed that the team was not yet ready to compete with Europe's best teams.

After four seasons, Benfica proved ready to challenge for the European Cup in 1987–88. After eliminating teams like Anderlecht and Steaua București, they reached their sixth final in the competition, where they met PSV in a match played at Stuttgart's Neckarstadion on 25 May 1988. Following a goalless draw at the end of extra time, the match was decided by a penalty shoot-out. The Dutch side – fielding five Netherlands national team players that would go on to conquer the UEFA Euro 1988 a month later – converted all of their penalty kicks, whereas António Veloso allowed goalkeeper Hans van Breukelen to defend his penalty kick, and sealed Benfica's fourth consecutive European Cup final loss. Benfica did not wait long to make another appearance in the European Cup's showpiece match, as two years later – and with Swedish manager Eriksson again in charge – a team including Brazil's starting centre-backs Ricardo Gomes and Aldair, together with midfielders Valdo and Jonas Thern, eliminated Marseille with a controversial handled goal from Vata to reach their seventh European Cup final. Before the final, Eusébio visited Béla Guttmann's grave, asking for forgiveness in hope of ending the curse. On 23 May 1990, Benfica faced title holders Milan at Vienna's Praterstadion and were unable to prevent Frank Rijkaard to score the winning goal and give the Italian side its fourth and second consecutive European Cup title.

In the early 1990s, Benfica took part in the last edition of the European Cup before being reformulated and converted into the UEFA Champions League. They reached the tournament's group stage after a successful performance at Highbury against Arsenal, with Isaías and Vasili Kulkov scoring in extra time. In the group stage, Benfica ended in third place, behind Barcelona and Sparta Prague. In 1992–93, Benfica reached the quarter-finals of the UEFA Cup, beating eventual winners Juventus at home (their only loss in the competition), but losing 3–1 in Turin. The following season, Benfica returned to the Cup Winners' Cup and reached the semi-finals after a 5–5 aggregate draw against Bayer Leverkusen in the quarter-finals was decided on away goals. In Lisbon, Benfica beat Parma 2–1 for the first leg of the semi-finals, with Vítor Paneira even missing a penalty. However, in the return leg, centre-back Carlos Mozer was sent off on the 20th minute and the team resisted for 55 minutes before Roberto Sensini scored the only goal of the match, which put the Italians through. In their debut in the Champions League in 1994–95, Benfica won their group but succumbed to Milan in the knockout phase.

Competitive record 

Note: Benfica score is always listed first.

1995–2009
In the late 1990s, the club's European performances did not match Benfica's historic record, with only a quarter-final presence in the 1996–97 UEFA Cup Winners' Cup as a highlight. The team's performances were subpar, with their lowest peak coming in the form of a 7–0 loss against Celta Vigo, which remains as Benfica's heaviest European defeat.

After missing two seasons of European football for the first time since 1960, Benfica returned to UEFA competition in 2003–04. They entered that season's Champions League in the third qualifying round, but defeats against Lazio demoted them to the UEFA Cup. There, the team reached the fourth round, where they were eliminated by Inter Milan with a 4–3 away loss. After another season without playing in the Champions League, Benfica returned to UEFA's main competition in 2005–06, where they achieved their best performance in eleven years. Benfica knocked Manchester United out of the competition in the group stage and eliminated title holders Liverpool in the subsequent round, grabbing the club's first-ever win at Anfield. In the quarter-finals, Benfica were eliminated by Barcelona after a 2–0 loss at Camp Nou. The next two seasons were fairly similar; in 2006–07 and 2007–08, Benfica finished third in the group stage and were demoted to the UEFA Cup, failing to go further than the quarter-finals.

Competitive record 

Note: Benfica score is always listed first.

2009–present
In 2009–10, Benfica had a noteworthy run in the newly created UEFA Europa League, progressing all the way from the play-off round to the quarter-finals. Their campaign featured a 5–0 thrashing of English side Everton in the group stage and an aggregate 3–2 defeat of Marseille in the round of 16 The following season, Benfica returned to the Champions League, but as in 2006–07 and 2007–08, they were demoted to the Europa League. This time, however, the team overcame the quarter-final stage to reach their first European semi-final in 17 years. In the first ever European match between Portuguese teams, Benfica were surprised by Braga and missed the chance to qualify to the final. Benfica improved their European performance in the 2011–12 Champions League, progressing all the way to the quarter-finals. In the group stage, Benfica topped their group – knocking Manchester United out of European competitions once again – and defeated Zenit Saint Petersbourg in the last 16 before losing 3–1 on aggregate to Chelsea.

In the 2012–13 and 2013–14 seasons, Benfica's run in the Champions League was not so successful, but the club managed to reach two Europa League finals, the first of them 23 years after their last appearance in a European final. Benfica lost the two finals, on 17 May 2013 against Champions League holders Chelsea, with a 2–1 injury-time header from Branislav Ivanović, and on 15 May 2014 to Sevilla, through a penalty shoot-out after a goalless draw, which Benfica lost 4–2. This extended the club's run of European final losses to eight.

In the mid 2010s, Benfica reached the Champions League knockout stage twice in a row for their first time. They qualified to the quarter-finals for a 18th time in 2015–16, where they lost 3–2 on aggregate to Bayern Munich, and were eliminated by Borussia Dortmund in the round of 16 in 2016–17. The following seasons, Benfica failed to advance to the later stages of UEFA's prime tournament, setting the worst ever performance by a Portuguese team in 2017–18, with 6 losses and a negative goal difference of 13. Moreoever, by losing 5–0 to Basel, they equalled their previous biggest loss in the competition, against Borussia Dortmund in 1963–64.

Competitive record 

Last updated: 7 March 2023Note: Benfica score is always listed first.

Records

Benfica were the first Portuguese side to reach the final of the European Cup, the first to win it and the only one to this day to win the trophy in consecutive years. In the 1960s, they reached the final five times, more than any other team, surpassing Real Madrid and Milan, who reached three finals each. Their ten European finals are also a domestic record, and with 42 participations in the Champions League (formerly the European Cup), only Real Madrid has played more seasons in the competition.

Most appearances in European competition: Luisão, 127
Most goals in European competition: Eusébio, 56
First European match: Sevilla 3–1 Benfica in the European Cup, on 19 September 1957
Biggest win: Benfica 10–0 Stade Dudelange in the European Cup, on 5 October 1965
First goal in European competition: Francisco Palmeiro, in the 40th minute against Sevilla, on 19 September 1957
Biggest defeat: Celta Vigo 7–0 Benfica in the UEFA Cup, on 25 November 1999
Highest European home attendance: 110,000, against Marseille in the European Cup, on 18 April 1990

By competition

By country

Finals

Semi-finals won

Semi-finals lost

Notes

References

Bibliography
 
 

Europe
Benfica